Lee Yin Yee (born 1952)  is a Chinese billionaire and businessman, the founder and chairman of Xinyi Glass and Xinyi Solar.

Lee made the 2022 Forbes Billionaires List with an estimated wealth of $4.2 billion and occupied the 687th position. He is the main shareholder of the Xinyi Glass.

His son Lee Shing Put is married to the daughter of former Chinese vice-premier Zhang Gaoli.

References 

1952 births
Living people
Chinese billionaires
20th-century Chinese businesspeople
21st-century Chinese businesspeople